Seth Thibodeaux (born 1980) is an American baseball coach and former catcher. He currently is assistant coach for the Louisiana Ragin Cajuns. He played college baseball at LSU Eunice from 1999 to 2000 before transferring to William Carey, where he played for coach Bobby Halford from 2001 to 2002. He then served as the head coach of the Nicholls Colonels (2011–2021).

Coaching career
On August 1, 2007, Thibodeaux was named an assistant coach at Nicholls State.

On August 18, 2010, Thibodeaux was promoted to head coach for the 2011 season. On June 3, 2021, Thibodeaux resigned as the head coach of Nicholls.  On June 8, 2021, Thibodeaux joined the Louisiana Ragin Cajuns as assistant coach, under head coach Matt Deggs.

Head coaching record
Below is a table of Thibodeaux's yearly records as an NCAA head baseball coach.

References

Living people
1980 births
People from Church Point, Louisiana
Baseball players from Louisiana
Baton Rouge Riverbats players
Pearl River Wildcats baseball coaches
Louisiana Ragin' Cajuns baseball coaches
LSU Eunice Bengals baseball players
Nicholls Colonels baseball coaches
Southeastern Louisiana Lions baseball coaches